Angelika Hurwicz (22 April 1922, Berlin – 26 November 1999, Bergen) was a German actress and theatre director. She worked with Bertolt Brecht at his Berliner Ensemble company until 1958, when she moved to West Germany.

1922 births
1999 deaths
German stage actresses
German theatre directors
20th-century German actresses